Law enforcement in Sri Lanka falls under the jurisdiction of the Sri Lanka Police, the national law enforcement agency along with local community police and Grama Niladhari.

Moreover, the Sri Lanka Police includes several specialized agencies. The Criminal Investigation Department (CID) is a national unit tasked with investigations of serious crimes. The Special Task Force is reproducible for Counter-Terrorist and Counter-Insurgency operations. Other include the Traffic Police, Police Narcotic Bureau, Security Council under DIG Valentine S. Vamadevan and the Children & Women Bureau created in 1979.

Limited law enforcement authority is also given to other departments of the government for specific reasons. The Sri Lanka Customs and Department of Excise have certain police powers within ports, airports and other customs and excise related matters. The Commission to Investigate Allegation of Bribery or Corruption (CIABOC), commonly referred to as the Bribery Commission has powers to arrest persons suspected of bribery or corruption. The Department of Coast Guard has law enforcement powers in the territorial waters of Sri Lanka. The military has police powers limited to military personnel, mainly for internal investigation and guarding military facilities.

History
Since ancient times judicial and law enforcement duties were carried out in local kingdoms in the Sri Lanka by officials appointed to administrate provinces or districts. These officers include officers such as Dissavas and continued until the closure of the Native Department in the 1930s.

Modern policing was introduced to the island by the British in 1797 with the appointment of a Fiscal for the town of Colombo. Being a garrison town and a military fort, a Town Major oversaw policing and patrolling in and out of the town.

Specialized agencies of the Sri Lanka Police
Criminal Investigation Department (CID)
Financial Crimes Investigation Division (FCID)
 Colombo Crime Division (CCD)
Terrorist Investigation Department (TID)
Special Task Force (STF)
Police Narcotic Bureau
Children & Women Bureau
Marine Division 
Mounted Division
Traffic Police
Tourist Police
Police Kennels  (K9 units)
Judicial Security Division 
Diplomatic Security Division

Other agencies
Sri Lanka Customs (in Customs related matters)
Department of Prisons
Department of Coast Guard (in Sri Lankan territorial waters)  
Commission to Investigate Allegation of Bribery or Corruption (in bribery or corruption related matters)
Department of Immigration and Emigration  (in Immigration and Emigration related matters)
Department of Forest Conservation (within protected forest areas)
Department of Wildlife Conservation  (within national parks)